BFSR may refer to:

Bank Financial Strength Rating (Moody's) or Bank Fundamental Strength Rating (Standard & Poor's), a specialised form of credit rating
Battlefield surveillance radar
BFSR-SR, short-range battlefield surveillance radar used by the Indian Army
Behaviorists For Social Responsibility, a special interest group of the Association for Behavior Analysis International
Boston Free Speech rally